Guided Functional Peer Support (GFP) is a working model used in peer support work in communities for groups with special needs. The model is a consolidation of peer support and functional activities with the aim to support for example young adult mental health clients. The model gives clients methods to find suitable ways of life management and to improve their social skills. 

The historical background of the GFP-model is based on Célestin Freinet's pedagogic work. The model has also a recognizable connection to social pedagogy and social psychiatry. In addition to these, the model is also strongly influenced by John Dewey's work on functional psychology, Mark Ragins's recovery movement in mental health care and Viktor Frankl, Aaron Antonovsky and Michel Foucault's work.
 
The model was originally developed by Markus Raivio, music therapist and project director. The model was created while Raivio was working for the Niemikoti Foundation during the period 1998-2009 and piloted in ELVIS-project in Niemikoti foundation 2009-2012 with collaboration of music therapist Teppo Tolvanen and occupational therapist Heidi Karjalainen. In culture houses mental health clients are participating in training programs to tutor functional groups to each other. The model is implemented in five Culture Houses in Finland; in Helsinki, Lohja, Kainuu, Tampere and Jyväskylä. Local Youth Service Centers work in cooperation with the Culture Houses by lending space and equipment. The houses are mainly financed by Finland's Slot Machine Association (RAY).

The Finnish Rehabilitation Foundation carried out an evaluation of effectiveness of the GFP-model within the ELVIS-project in 2011. The results of the evaluation indicate that there is a genuine demand for Culture Houses. Five young adults retire to disability pension for mental health reasons every day in Finland. The Culture House in Helsinki, ELVIS, had 72 young mental health clients with various diagnoses. After the first year 21 of them applied for school or work. Today Culture House ELVIS has over 25 functional groups running weekly. In the Culture House in Lohja three peer tutors out of ten returned to work after the first six months.
The GFP-model differentiates from traditional disease-oriented treatment with its focus on functionality through interaction. The peer tutors are trained by professionals to support psychiatric rehabilitation clients in groups. Instead of focusing on problems, the clients do and learn new things that they are interested in together. The contents of the functional groups are usually art-based and include for example music, multimedia and visual arts, but activities with animals and sports are also common.

References

External links 
 Markus Raivio's speech "Mental Health and Functional Peer Support"
 Markus Raivio's speech on Action Moday GFP Functional Peer Support"
 GFP winner of th Pedro Montellano good practice award 2019"
 Markus Raivio's iBook "Young Heroes"

Mental health in Finland
Treatment of mental disorders